Funky Butt may refer to:

Funky Butt (band), a Norwegian jazz band
Funky Butt (dance), a blues dance
"Funky Butt" (song), an early ragtime song associated with Buddy Bolden
Funky Butt (album), a 1981 album by jazz saxophonist Arnett Cobb